The 1925 United States Senate election in Wisconsin was held on September 29, 1925 to complete the unexpired term of U.S. Senator Robert La Follette, who died on June 18.

The seat was won by La Follette's son and personal secretary, Robert M. La Follette Jr. over mostly Republican opposition. He defeated three candidates in the Republican primary and overcame a challenge from fellow Republican Edward F. Dithmar, running on a "Coolidge & Dawes Platform" ticket.

Republican primary

Candidates
Robert M. La Follette Jr., son and personal secretary of late Senator Robert M. La Follette
 Francis E. McGovern, former Governor of Wisconsin (1911–15)
 Roy P. Wilcox, former State Senator from Eau Claire and candidate for Governor in 1920 and 1924
 Daniel C. Woodward

Results

Democratic primary

Candidates
 Willam G. Bruce, former chair of the Milwaukee Democratic Party
 Rogers

Results

Socialist primary

Candidates
 John M. Work, candidate for Governor of Iowa in 1903 and 1910

Results

General election

Candidates
 John M. Work, candidate for Governor of Iowa in 1903 and 1910 (Socialist)
 Robert M. La Follette Jr., son of late Senator La Follette (Republican)
 Edward F. Dithmar, former Lieutenant Governor of Wisconsin (Independent Republican)
 George Bauman (Socialist Labor)
 William G. Bruce, former chair of the Milwaukee Democratic Party (Independent Democratic)

Results

See also 
 1926 United States Senate elections

References 

Wisconsin 1925 special
1925
Wisconsin 1925
United States Senate 1925 special
Wisconsin
United States Senate